Yanis Ammour (born 21 May 1999) is a French professional footballer who plays as a forward.

Club career
On 4 April 2018, Ammour signed his first professional contract with his childhood club Montpellier HSC. He made his professional debut in a 2–0 Ligue 1 win over Girondins de Bordeaux on 21 October 2018.

On 31 August 2021, he signed with Super League Greece 2 club AEK Athens B.

Personal life
Born in France, Ammour is of Tunisian descent.

References

External links
 
 
 
 
 MHSC Foot Profile

1999 births
Living people
Footballers from Montpellier
French footballers
France youth international footballers
French sportspeople of Tunisian descent
Association football forwards
Montpellier HSC players
AS Béziers (2007) players
Ligue 1 players
Championnat National players
Championnat National 2 players
Championnat National 3 players
French expatriate footballers
Expatriate footballers in Greece
French expatriate sportspeople in Greece
AEK Athens F.C. B players